Ancilla adelphe is a species of sea snail, a marine gastropod mollusk in the family Ancillariidae, the olives.

Description

Distribution
This marine species occurs off Madagascar.

References

  Kilburn R.N. (1981). Revision of the genus Ancilla Lamarck, 1799 (Mollusca: Olividae: Ancillinae). Annals of the Natal Museum. 24(2): 349–463

adelphe
Gastropods described in 1981